The knockout stage of the 2003 FIFA Women's World Cup was the second and final stage of the 2003 FIFA Women's World Cup in the United States. It began on October 1, 2003, and ended with the final at the Home Depot Center, Carson, California on October 12, 2003. Germany, China, Norway, Brazil, Canada, Russia, Sweden, and defending champions United States. Canada, Germany, Sweden and the United States made it to the semi-finals. Sweden beat Canada 2–1 to reach the final, while Germany overcame the host country 3–0. The United States beat its neighbors for third place, and Germany beat Sweden 2–1 in the final in extra time.

This was the last World Cup to use the golden goal rule; it would be abolished in 2005 as the extra time play was restored.

All times listed below are in American time (EDT/UTC−4, PDT/UTC–7).

Qualified teams

Bracket

Quarter-finals

Brazil vs Sweden

United States vs Norway

Germany vs Russia

China PR vs Canada

Semi-finals

United States vs Germany

Sweden vs Canada

Third place play-off

Final

References

External links
2003 FIFA Women's World Cup knockout stage

knockout stage
2003
knock
knock
knock
2003 in Chinese football
knock
knock
2003 in Russian football
Knock